Joseph Peter Kutina (January 16, 1885 – April 13, 1945) was a Major League Baseball first baseman who played in  and  with the St. Louis Browns.

External links

1885 births
1912 deaths
Major League Baseball first basemen
St. Louis Browns players
Meridian Ribboners players
Fond du Lac Cubs players
Milwaukee Brewers (minor league) players
Fond du Lac Giants players
Saginaw Krazy Kats players
Montgomery Rebels players
Baseball players from Chicago
Burials at Bohemian National Cemetery (Chicago)